Reineckeiidae is an extinct ammonoid cephalopod family belonging to the superfamily Perisphinctoidea.

These fast-moving nektonic carnivores lived during the Jurassic period, from the Callovian to the Oxfordian.

References

External links
 Ammonites
 Jsdammonites

Ammonitida families
Perisphinctoidea
Callovian first appearances
Late Jurassic extinctions